Basic Education High School No. 9 Mandalay (formerly, St. Peter's High School and State High School No. 9 Mandalay, commonly known as St. Peter's, SHS 9 Mandalay and BEHS 9 Mandalay (အထက (၉) မန္တလေး), is a public high school in downtown Mandalay, Myanmar.

Known during the British colonial days and parliamentary days of Burma as St. Peter's English High School, the Roman Catholic parochial school was the top school of choice for the children of the elite from Mandalay and Upper Burma. Many of the country's who's who in those days were alumni of St. Peter's. Many professionals and top-level leaders of Aung San Suu Kyi's government from Mandalay are also  alumni of St. Peter's.

History

St. Peter's High School (1897 - 1965) 

The school was founded as St. Peter's High School by the De La Salle Brothers, a Roman Catholic order on 1 May 1897. It was the first La Sallian high school founded in Upper Burma, and the third in the whole Burma after St. Patrick's in Mawlamyine and St. Paul's in Rangoon.

St. Peter's High School was started teaching over 80 students. In 1924, there were 11 teachers and 350 students, including 130 resident students.

Brother Director John managed the school for 18 years until he moved to St. Paul's in 1915. The swimming pool was constructed during his administration. Brother Clementian served as Brother Director from 1933 to 1948 for the first time, and from 1950 to 1956 for the second time. In 1952, Primary School was opened at the two-storey hall (now  Nyana Hall) on the left side of the east gate. In 1955, a new Chapel and Study Hall were extended at the three-storey building. In 1957, during the administration of Brother Director Peter, single-storeyed Kindergarten Hall was built on the southern campus of the school. It was reconstructed as a two-storey building (now Thiha Hall) in 1962-1963.

Since it was opened, the school accepted boys only for some time.
The all-boys school was among the few early schools that educated the children of the country's British officers, the Anglo-Burmese, the Anglo-Indians and the wealthy Burmese. The language of instruction was mainly English in the early days, and bi-lingual for some classes in the later days. There were also some Hebrew classes for the Jewish.

State High School No. 9 Mandalay (1965-1983) 

General Ne Win's military government nationalized the school in April 1965, and changed the name to State High School No. 9 Mandalay (SHS 9 Mandalay). The primary language of instruction became Burmese. The school, which used to have a "Roll of Honour" for its outstanding students, steadily lost significance partly due to the new requirement to attend nearby schools as much as possible.

Campus 

BEHS 9 is one of the few high schools in Mandalay with a sizable campus, covering perhaps 75% of the entire city square block. The compound of St. Michael's Church Mandalay, west of the school, takes up the other 25% of the block. (The school is bounded by 86th Shwetachaung road to the east and 87th street to the west.) Shwe Kyee Myin Pagoda, Basic Education High School No. 10 Mandalay (formerly, Diocesan High School), Basic Education High School No. 8 Mandalay (formerly, St. Joseph's Convent School), Basic Education High School No. 11 Mandalay, Basic Education High School No. 4 Mandalay, and Basic Education High School No. 1 Mandalay are located in the vicinity of the school.

During the World War II, when the school was transformed into a hospital, St. Peter's High School was reopened at the Norman school campus (now BEHS 4 Mandalay). Its campus moved to the original and current place in 1952.

The current school, BEHS 9, is open in the gated southern campus since the northern campus, inclusive of three-storey building, is donated to the Department of Basic Education, Ministry of Education in Myanmar.

The gated campus consists of:
 Nyana Hall (Wisdom Hall), two-storey red building, for ceremonial hall and principal's office (1st floor); examination hall (2nd floor)
(It is the Main Hall)
 Nawarat Hall, two-storey building, for KG, Grade 1 and library (1st floor); devotional shrine room and language lab (2nd floor)
 Assembly field at the frontage of Nawarat Hall
 New Hall, L-shape one-storey building, for staff office, laboratory rooms and locker room (frontage); hostel for the principal (back side)
 Thiha Hall, two-storey building, for all classes from Grade 2 to Grade 11
 Badminton and table-tennis courts
 Basketball court
 Regulation size football pitch
 Smaller practice football pitch; also used as outdoor volleyball and cricket courts
 Chinlone court
 Cafeteria.

Programs 

The school offers classes from KG to Grade 11 in accordance with the syllabus and curriculums prescribed by the Department of Basic Education under the Ministry of Education in Myanmar.

School library 

The school library is open during one-hour lunch break. Librarian and members of school library committee (teachers) manage and maintain the library systematically in line with the instructions of the principal. Member cards for students are free of charge. There are hundreds of books, inclusive of encyclopedias, written in both English and Burmese.

Labs 

Both language and experimental science labs are available. Chemistry, physics and biology labs have enough teaching and learning aids for highschool students. Students have to join science labs when necessary for their studies, maybe once or twice a month.

Co-curriculum activities 

Co-curriculum activities such as morals, life skills, arts, music and physical training are available for all levels of students.

Sports 

Having sufficient facilities and good training, BEHS 9 Mandalay is well known for its students winning medals in basic education level tournaments every year.

Clubs and activities
BEHS 9 Mandalay has both academic and extra-curricular clubs and activities according to each year's academic calendar.

School council

As all public schools in Myanmar are required to form School Council, BEHS 9 Mandalay forms its one with five houses— Anawratha, Kyansittha, Bayintnaung, Alaungpaya and Bandula— every year. The school council consists of the head (principal), five leading students from 9th Standard, five leading teachers from each team, six representatives of six standards (Grade 6 to Grade 11) and one secretary from 10th standard. Each team has to do some chores, for the cleanliness of its class and the school, in group each day before the school begins its classes. In the last period of each week on Friday, all five teams work in pairs for the maintenance of the green environment in their respective areas. All of their work mark as scores for each team. According to the sequence of the sores, in the first day of a school week, order in column of their teams are shown. The greater the higher.

The four stars in the badge of BEHS 9 Mandalay represents the houses of school council which were originally four houses.

Fife and drum corps
St. Peter's boys band once was the most popular in Mandalay. Many awards were achieved. However the band was dissolved for some reasons.

In July 2019, school alumni co-ordinated with the principal, and formed new fife and drum corps with the current students. From August 2019 onwards, music lessons were started for BEHS 9 Mandalay's band.

Waso ceremony
On the full moon day of Waso each year, BEHS 9 Mandalay offers Waso flowers at nearby Shwe Kyee Myin pagoda, and Waso robes are offered.

Uniform 

Like all public schools in Myanmar, students of BEHS 9 Mandalay have to wear the school uniform at all times. There are two sets of uniform— one from KG to 4th Standard, and another more traditional one from the 5th Standard to 10th Standard. But all uniforms are of the same colour— a white shirt or blouse, with a green garment for the torso.

Principals

BEHS 9 Mandalay 

 Hla
 Nyan Tun
 May May Tin
 Than Hnit
 Khin Nyunt Yee
 Yi Yi May
 San Yu Mar (2009–2014)
 Mya Mya Than (2014–2017)
 Ohnmar Kyi (2017–present)

Notable alumni

Civil and military politicians

Professionals, artists and businessmen

References

External links 
De La Salle Christian Brothers 
De La Salle Christian Brothers, Province of Great Britain  
Brief history of the Lasallian Institute 
Catholic Encyclopedia article  Mentioned about the school in Mandalay in this article, Institute of the Brothers of the Christian Schools under the heading Schools of Europe and the East.
Works by the Institute of the Brothers of the Christian Schools  at Project Gutenberg 
 Old and recent pictures of Brother Director Felix of St. Peter’s and St. Paul, Burma / Myanmar
 St. Peter’s High School or No. (9) S H S (now BEHS) Mandalay
 St.Peter’s High School Mandalay Homage invitation, list of teachers and students 2011
 Face Book of No 9 SHS (BEHS) St. Peter's Mandalay

High schools in Mandalay